Lusen is a mountain in Bavaria (Germany) and in the Plzeň Region of (Czech Republic) with a peak of 1373 metres. It is the sixth-highest mountain in the Bavarian Forest National Park/Bohemian Forest, behind the Großer Rachel, Kleiner Rachel, Kleiner Arber, Plattenhausenriegel and Großer Arber. Streams forming on the north side become tributaries of the Vydra.

The Lusen is popular for hiking in summer and winter. There is a winter trail which is usually cleared of snow. However, the Bohemian wind blows rather strongly and often covers everything in ice. panorama shot of the summit.

The winter trail is also ideal for sledging.

Mountains of Bavaria
Bohemian Forest
Mountains of the Bavarian Forest